The United States Air Force's 9th Intelligence Squadron is an intelligence unit located at Beale Air Force Base, California. The 9th is associated with Lockheed U-2 and Distributed Common Ground System operations.  The squadron was first active during World War II as the 9th Photographic Technical Unit, serving in the European Theater of Operations.

The 9th Reconnaissance Technical Squadron was active from 1948 through 1950 and again from 1966 through 1991, primarily as the photographic interpretation unit of the 9th Strategic Reconnaissance Wing.  It was consolidated with the 9th Photographic Technical Unit in 1985 and the 9th Intelligence Squadron in 2009.

Mission
The 9th operates and maintains the $15M Deployable Shelterized System-Film, the Department of Defense's only mobile film processing capability, as part of the Air Force Distributed Common Ground System architecture.  The unit also processes, exploits, and disseminates broad area, high-resolution imagery collected by the Lockheed U-2 to meet combatant commander requirements.

History

World War II
The squadron was first organized in France during the fall of 1944 as the 9th Photographic Laboratory Section.  The section would provide processing of reconnaissance photography for XXIX Tactical Air Command (Provisional).  It continued this mission through V-E Day.  It briefly acted as part of the army of occupation, returning to the United States in November 1945, where it was inactivated at the port of embarkation.

Strategic reconnaissance support
The second predecessor of the squadron was activated  in July 1948 as the 12th Photographic Technical Squadron at Topeka Air Force Base, Kansas, where it was assigned to the 311th Air Division, which was the primary reconnaissance headquarters for Strategic Air Command (SAC).  In 1949, SAC reorganized its reconnaissance assets, assigning the squadron to the 9th Strategic Reconnaissance Wing and moving it to Fairfield-Suisun Air Force Base, California as the 9th Reconnaissance Technical Squadron.

On 1 April 1950, however, the 9th Wing mission changed from long-range reconnaissance to strategic bombardment.  Ten days later, the 9th Squadron moved to Rapid City Air Force Base, South Dakota, where it was assigned to the 28th Strategic Reconnaissance Wing.  It was inactivated at the end of the month, with its assets forming the cadre for the 28th Reconnaissance Technical Squadron.

The squadron was again organized in late June 1966, at Beale Air Force Base, California, where it absorbed the mission, personnel and equipment of the 4203d Reconnaissance Technical Squadron, which was discontinued the same day.  The squadron processed reconnaissance products produced by the 9th Strategic Reconnaissance Wing's Lockheed SR-71 Blackbird and, later, Lockheed U-2 Dragon Ladys until inactivating in July 1991.

Intelligence
The 9th Intelligence Support Squadron was activated at Beale in September 1991, the same day its predecessor was inactivated, assuming much of its mission, equipment and personnel.  The squadron dropped "support" from its name in 2003, and in July 2009, the two squadrons were consolidated.

Lineage 
 9th Photographic Technical Unit
 Constituted as the 9th Photographic Laboratory Section on 25 August 1944
 Activated on 5 September 1944
 Redesignated 9th Photographic Technical Unit on 13 October 1944
 Inactivated on 4 October 1945
 Consolidated with the 9th Reconnaissance Technical Squadron as the 9th Reconnaissance Technical Squadron on 16 October 1984

 9th Reconnaissance Technical Squadron
 Constituted as the 12th Photographic Technical Squadron on 29 June 1948
 Activated on 19 July 1948
 Redesignated 9th Reconnaissance Technical Squadron on 4 March 1949
 Inactivated on 1 May 1950
 Activated on 18 May 1966 (not organized)
 Organized on 25 June 1966
 Consolidated with the 9th Photographic Technical Unit on 16 October 1984
 Inactivated on 1 September 1991
 Consolidated with the 9th Intelligence Squadron as the 9th Intelligence Squadron on 21 July 2009

 9th Intelligence Squadron
 Constituted as the 9th Intelligence Support Squadron on 29 August 1991
 Activated on 1 September 1991
 Redesignated 9 Intelligence Squadron on 9 January 2003
 Consolidated with the 9th Reconnaissance Technical Squadron on 21 July 2009

Assignments
 Ninth Air Force, 5 September 1944 (attached to XXIX Tactical Air Command (Provisional) after 5 November 1944)
 IX Fighter Command, 1 December 1944 (attached to XXIX Tactical Air Command (Provisional))
 363d Tactical Reconnaissance Group, 18 May 1945
 XII Tactical Air Command, 5 August–4 Oct 1945
 311th Air Division, 19 July 1948
 9th Strategic Reconnaissance Wing (later 9 Bombardment Wing), 1 June 1949
 28th Strategic Reconnaissance Wing, 10 April–1 May 1950
 Strategic Air Command, 18 May 1966 (not organized)
 9th Strategic Reconnaissance Wing, 25 June 1966 – 1 September 1991
 9th Operations Group, 1 September 1991
 548th Intelligence Group, 1 December 2003 – present

Stations
 Chantilly, Oise, France, 5 September 1944
 Le Culot Airfield (Y-10), France [sic], 1 December 1944
 Belgium, 16 February 1945
 Gutersloh-Marienfelde Airfield (Y-99), Germany, 16 April 1945
 Wiesbaden-Erbenheim Airfield (Y-80), Germany, 31 May 1945
 Eschwege Airfield (R-11), Germany, 31 July–26 September 1945
 Boston Port of Embarkation, Massachusetts, 3-4 October 1945
 Topeka Air Force Base, Kansas, 19 July 1948
 Fairfield-Suisun Air Force Base, California, 1 June 1949
 Rapid City Air Force Base, South Dakota, 10 April–1 May 1950
 Beale Air Force Base, California, 25 June 1966 – 1 September 1991
 Beale Air Force Base, California, 1 Sep 1991 – present

References

Notes
 Explanatory notes

 Citations

Bibliography

 

Cate gory:Military units and formations in California
0009